Fernando Brambila, or Ferdinando Brambilla, (12 July 1763 – 23 January 1834) was an Italian painter and engraver who spent most of his life in Spain, where he worked for the Royal Court. He is best known for his participation in the Malaspina Expedition.

Biography 
He was born in Cassano d'Adda. He decided to become an artist at an early age and worked as a painter in Milan, where he studied with Giocondo Albertolli at the Brera Academy.  His early style was heavily influenced by the French painter Claude Joseph Vernet.

In 1790, he was working as a set designer and scenery painter at La Scala when Francesco Melzi d'Eril and Count , on behalf of the Spanish government,  proposed that he be added to the Malaspina Expedition as one of the official artists. He was hired, together with Giovanni Ravenet, a painter from Parma, to replace artists who had resigned.

In April 1791, he began his journey to join the expedition. After making his way to La Coruña, he boarded the frigate El Cortés, headed for America. He met with the expedition at Acapulco, where he executed his first paintings. The naturalist Antonio Pineda later claimed that Brambila also travelled about to paint Aztec antiquities, but these works have not been found.

He was stationed aboard the corvette Atrevida. His paintings included numerous panoramic views with the precise details of defensive systems, monuments etc.; from Guam, the Mariana Islands, Palapa, Sorsogon City and  Zamboanga in the Philippines, Macao, Port Jackson and Parramatta in Australia, Vava'u, Lima, Buenos Aires and Montevideo.

He and Ravenet returned together in 1795 and remained in Spain, working for the government at a rate of 27,000 reales per year, as stipulated in their contract. He created lithographs and engravings based on his paintings for a book on the expedition. In 1799, on the occasion of Cardinal Luis María de Borbón's elevation to Archbishop of Toledo, he designed and created a triumphal arch for the Cathedral. That same year, King Carlos IV named him "Painter, Architect and Decorator for the Royal Court". He was married the following year, but had only one son before becoming a widower.

After the expedition
In May 1806, his contract expired. He and Ravenet presented all of their works to Count , Director of the Hydrographic Office. Two years later, following the Siege of Zaragoza, he and his fellow artist Juan Gálvez went there by invitation of General José de Palafox to create a graphic record of the event's aftermath. Thirty-two of these drawings were later published as Grabados de la Ruina de Zaragoza. He briefly returned to Madrid, then fled to Cádiz when it became obvious that Napoleon's troops would take the city.

Following the end of the Peninsular War, he went back to Madrid, where he took up his position as Court Painter under the new King, Fernando VII. In 1814, he was appointed the Director of Perspective and Decorative Art at the Real Academia de Bellas Artes de San Fernando and became an Academician of Merit the following year.

In 1817, the Academy published his Tratado de Principios Elementales de Perspectiva. Four years later, he was commissioned to create a series of paintings and lithographs depicting Royal sites; including El Escorial, Aranjuez, Buen Retiro and Moncloa Palace; a project that kept him engaged until 1832. They were published as Vistas de los Sitios Reales y Madrid.

He had suffered from a serious illness in 1829 and never fully recovered. After seeking cures at various spas, he died at his home in Madrid in 1834.

References

Further reading
 Carmen Sotos Serrano, Los Pintores de la Expedición de Alejandro Malaspina, Real Academia de la Historia, 1982 
 José Luis Sancho, Aranjuez: Solan de Cabras- La Isabela (Las Visitas de los Sitios Reales  por Brambilla), Doce Calles, 2002,

External links 

"The Siege of Zaragoza", exhibition at the 
More works by Brambila @ the Biblioteca Digital Hispánica.

1763 births
1834 deaths
18th-century Italian painters
Italian male painters
19th-century Italian painters
Italian engravers
Italian landscape painters
Italian vedutisti
Artists from the Province of Bergamo
Spanish painters
Brera Academy alumni
Court painters
19th-century Italian male artists
18th-century Italian male artists